Adult Contemporary is a chart published by Billboard ranking the top-performing songs in the United States in the adult contemporary music (AC) market.  In 1997, 10 different songs topped the chart in 52 issues of the magazine, based on weekly airplay data from radio stations compiled by Nielsen Broadcast Data Systems.

In the year's first issue of Billboard, "Un-Break My Heart" by Toni Braxton moved up to number one, displacing the final chart-topper of 1996, "When You Love a Woman" by the band Journey.  Braxton's song held the top spot for 14 consecutive weeks, the year's longest unbroken run at number one, before being displaced by Celine Dion's recording of the 1975 song "All by Myself".  In May, Bob Carlisle, an artist most associated with the contemporary Christian music scene, achieved an unexpected crossover hit and spent seven weeks at number one on the AC listing with "Butterfly Kisses"; despite being an Adult Contemporary number one and also charting in other genres, it remains his only song to appear on any of Billboards charts.  The song did not appear on the magazine's all-genre chart, the Hot 100, because it was serviced to radio but not available as a physical single; at the time only songs which were physically released were eligible to appear on the Hot 100.

In the fall, LeAnn Rimes spent 11 weeks at number one with "How Do I Live", the second-longest run at number one in 1997.  The song had been written for the soundtrack of the film Con Air, but after Rimes had recorded her version of the song, film company executives changed their minds and asked Trisha Yearwood to record it for the soundtrack instead.  Rimes and her record label decided to release her version as a single anyway, with the result that both versions of the song went on sale at the same time in May 1997.  While Yearwood's recording achieved some success, it was eclipsed by the version recorded by Rimes, which went on to sell more than 3 million copies.  The year's final Adult Contemporary chart-topper was "Something About the Way You Look Tonight" by Elton John, which reached number one in the issue of Billboard dated November 22 and held the top spot for the remainder of the year.  The song was released as a double A-sided single with "Candle in the Wind 1997", the singer's tribute to his close friend Diana, Princess of Wales, who had died in August of the same year.  Because the Adult Contemporary chart is based on airplay of individual songs, the two tracks charted separately and "Something About the Way You Look Tonight" went all the way to number one while "Candle in the Wind 1997" peaked at number two.  The double-sided release went on to become one of the biggest-selling singles of all time, with recorded sales of over 30 million copies.

Chart history

References

See also
1997 in music
List of artists who reached number one on the U.S. Adult Contemporary chart

1997
1997 record charts
1997 in American music